Walter II ( or Gauthier) was the bishop of Autun from 1189 until 1223.

Walter's family background is unknown. He was a member of the regular clergy prior to his election as bishop in 1189. In 1202, he joined the Fourth Crusade in a ceremony alongside some knights from the Auvergne. He did not travel with the main army, but sailed with his company directly to the Holy Land from Marseille, thus avoiding the sack of Constantinople. Count Guigues III of Forez travelled in the same flotilla. Both arrived in Acre in early 1203.

Walter returned to the Holy Land with the Fifth Crusade in 1217.

Walter was dead by 1224. He was buried in the Abbey of Saint-Symphorien, Autun.

Notes

Bibliography

1220s deaths
Bishops of Autun
Christians of the Fourth Crusade
Christians of the Fifth Crusade
12th-century French Roman Catholic bishops
13th-century French Roman Catholic bishops